The 1959–60 National Hurling League was the 29th season of the National Hurling League.

Division 1

Tipperary came into the season as defending champions of the 1958-59 season. Carlow entered Division 1 as the promoted team.

On 1 May 1960, Tipperary won the title after a 2-15 to 3-8 win over Cork in the final. It was their second league title in succession and their 9th league title overall.

Cork's Christy Ring was the league's top scorer with 12-09.

Division 1A table

Group stage

Division 1B table

Group stage

Final

Top scorers

Top scorers overall

Top scorers in a single game

Division 2

Laois won the title following a 5-9 to 1-8 win over Roscommon in the final.

References

External links

National Hurling League seasons
Lea
Lea